The white wagtail (Motacilla alba) is a small passerine bird in the family Motacillidae, which also includes pipits and longclaws. The species breeds in much of Europe and the Asian Palearctic and parts of North Africa. It has a toehold in Alaska as a scarce breeder. It is resident in the mildest parts of its range, but otherwise migrates to Africa. In Ireland and Great Britain, the darker subspecies, the pied wagtail or water wagtail (M. a. yarrellii) predominates; this is also called in Ireland willie wagtail, not to be confused with the Australian species Rhipidura leucophrys which bears the same common name. In total, there are between 9 and 11 subspecies of M. alba.

The white wagtail is an insectivorous bird of open country, often near habitation and water. It prefers bare areas for feeding, where it can see and pursue its prey. In urban areas it has adapted to foraging on paved areas such as car parks. It nests in crevices in stone walls and similar natural and man-made structures.

It is the national bird of Latvia and has featured on the stamps of several countries. Though it is 'of least concern', there are several threats against it, like being kept as pets and being used as food.

Taxonomy and systematics

The white wagtail was one of the many species originally described by Carl Linnaeus in his landmark 1758 10th edition of Systema Naturae, and it still bears its original name Motacilla alba. The Latin genus name originally meant "little mover", but certain medieval writers thought it meant "wag-tail", giving rise to a new Latin word cilla for "tail". The specific epithet alba is Latin for "white".

Within the wagtail genus Motacilla, the white wagtail's closest genetic relatives appear to be other black-and-white wagtails such as the Japanese wagtail, Motacilla grandis, and the white-browed wagtail, Motacilla madaraspatensis (and possibly the Mekong wagtail, Motacilla samveasnae, the phylogenetic position of which is mysterious), with which it appears to form a superspecies. However, mtDNA cytochrome b and NADH dehydrogenase subunit 2 sequence data suggests that the white wagtail is itself polyphyletic or paraphyletic (i.e. the species is not itself a single coherent grouping). Other phylogenetic studies using mtDNA still suggest that there is considerable gene flow within the races and the resulting closeness makes Motacilla alba a single species. A study has suggested the existence of only two groups: the alboides group, with M. a. alboides, M. a. leucopsis and M. a. personata; and the alba group, with M. a. alba, M. a. yarrellii, M. a. baicalensis, M. a. ocularis, M. a. lugens, and M. a. subpersonata.

Description

The white wagtail is a slender bird,  in length (East Asian subspecies are longer, measuring up to ), with the characteristic long, constantly wagging tail of its genus.

There are a number of other subspecies, some of which may have arisen because of partial geographical isolation, such as the resident British and Irish form, the pied wagtail M. a. yarrellii, which now also breeds in adjacent areas of the neighbouring European mainland. The pied wagtail, named for naturalist William Yarrell, exchanges the grey colour of the nominate form with black (or very dark grey in females), but is otherwise identical in its behaviour. Other subspecies, the validity of some of which is questionable, differ in the colour of the wings, back, and head, or other features. Some races show sexual dimorphism during the breeding season. As many as six subspecies may be present in the wintering ground in India or Southeast Asia and here they can be difficult to distinguish. Phylogenetic studies using mtDNA suggest that some morphological features have evolved more than once, including the back and chin colour. Breeding M. a. yarrellii look much like the nominate race except for the black back, and M. a. alboides of the Himalayas differs from the Central Asian M. a. personata only by its black back. M. a. personata has been recorded breeding in the Siddar Valley of Kashmir of the Western Himalayas. It has also been noted that both back and chin change colour during the pre-basic moult; all black-throated subspecies develop white chins and throats in winter and some black-backed birds are grey-backed in winter.

The call of the white wagtail is a sharp chisick, slightly softer than the version given by the pied wagtail. The song is more regular in white than pied, but with little territorial significance, since the male uses a series of contact calls to attract the female.

Subspecies
Nine or eleven subspecies are currently recognised. This is because the black backed wagtail may be a separate species and M. a. dukhunensis may be part of M. a. alba. Information on the plumage differences and distribution of the subspecies of the white wagtail is shown below.

The British subspecies Motacilla alba yarellii was named after William Yarrell (1784-1856), the writer of the History of British Birds (first ed. 1843).

Distribution and habitat

This species breeds throughout Eurasia up to latitudes 75°N, only being absent in the Arctic from areas where the July isotherm is less than 4 °C. It also breeds in the mountains of Morocco and western Alaska. It occupies a wide range of habitats, but is absent from deserts. White wagtails are residents in the milder parts of its range such as western Europe and the Mediterranean, but migratory in much of the rest of its range. Northern European breeders winter around the Mediterranean and in tropical and subtropical Africa, and Asiatic birds move to the Middle East, India, and Southeast Asia. Birds from the North American population also winter in tropical Asia.

Behaviour and ecology
The most conspicuous habit of this species is a near-constant tail wagging, a trait that has given the species, and indeed the genus, its common name. In spite of the ubiquity of this behaviour, the reasons for it are poorly understood. It has been suggested that it may flush prey, or signal submissiveness to other wagtails. A study in 2004 has suggested instead that it is a signal of vigilance to potential predators.

Diet and feeding
The exact composition of the diet of white wagtails varies by location, but terrestrial and aquatic insects and other small invertebrates form the major part of the diet. These range from beetles, dragonflies, small snails, spiders, worms, crustaceans, to maggots found in carcasses and, most importantly, flies. Small fish fry have also been recorded in the diet. The white wagtail is somewhat unusual in the parts of its range where it is non-migratory as it is an insectivorous bird that continues to feed on insects during the winter (most other insectivorous birds in temperate climates migrate or switch to more vegetable matter).

Breeding

White wagtails are monogamous and defend breeding territories. The breeding season for most is from April to August, with the season starting later further north. Both sexes are responsible for building the nest, with the male responsible for initiating the nest building and the female for finishing the process. For second broods in the subspecies personata the female alone builds the nest, which is a rough cup assembled from twigs, grass, leaves and other plant matter, as the male is still provisioning the young. It is lined with soft materials, including animal hair. The nest is set into a crevice or hole—traditionally in a bank next to a river or ditch—but the species has also adapted to nesting in walls, bridges and buildings. One nest was found in the skull of a walrus. White wagtails will nest in association with other animals: particularly, where available, the dams of beavers and also inside the nests of golden eagles. Around three to eight eggs are laid, with the usual number being four to six. The eggs are cream-coloured, often with a faint bluish-green or turquoise tint, and heavily spotted with reddish brown; they measure, on average, . Both parents incubate the eggs, although the female generally does so for longer and incubates at night. The eggs begin to hatch after 12 days (sometimes as late as 16 days). Both parents feed the chicks until they fledge after between 12 and 15 days, and the chicks are fed for another week after fledging.

Though it is known to be a host species for the common cuckoo, the white wagtail typically deserts its nest if it has been parasitised. Moksnes et al. theorised that this occurs because the wagtail is too small to push the intruding egg out of the nest, and too short-billed to destroy the egg by puncturing it.

Status
The population size is between 130 and 230 million.
Population trends have not been quantified, but the species is not believed to approach the thresholds for the population decline criterion of the IUCN Red List (i.e. declining more than 30% in ten years or three generations). For these reasons, the species is evaluated to be of least concern. The population in Europe appears to be stable. The species has adapted well to human changes to the environment and has exploited human changes such as man-made structures that are used for nesting sites and increased open areas that are used for foraging. In a number of cities, notably Dublin, large flocks gather in winter to roost. They are therefore rated as of least concern. However, they are caught for sport and often then placed into collections. They are also kept as pets and eaten as food. Climate change may be affecting the time of their migration.

In culture
They have featured on stamps from Bahrain, Belarus, Belgium, Finland, Georgia, Hong Kong, Hungary, Iceland, Iran, Ireland, Israel, Jersey, Kuwait, Latvia, Norway, Poland, the United Kingdom and Vietnam. The white wagtail is the national bird of Latvia, and has been often mentioned in Latvian folk songs.

References

External links

 Videos, photos and sounds on the Internet Bird Collection
 Masked, pied and white wagtail photos - Norwegian Cyberbirding
 "Pied Wagtail... The Gipsy Bird" Pied wagtails in Welsh Romani culture - Romani Rise
 Identification article with pictures (PDF)
Ageing and sexing (PDF; 4.9 MB) by Javier Blasco-Zumeta & Gerd-Michael Heinze 

white wagtail
Holarctic birds
Birds of Japan
National symbols of Latvia
white wagtail
Articles containing video clips
white wagtail
Taxobox binomials not recognized by IUCN